The Radio One Sessions is a compilation of performances by the Northern Irish punk band Stiff Little Fingers for BBC Radio, recorded between 1980 and 1982. Tracks 1–4 were recorded for the Mike Read show on 1 February 1980. Tracks 5–8 were recorded for the Mike Read show in April 1981. Tracks 9–12 were recorded for the David "Kid" Jensen show on 19 November 1981. Tracks 13–16 were for Kid Jensen again in September 1982. The four sessions encompass songs from all four of the band's albums before they split up in 1983, although they reformed four years later.

Track listing 
"Fly the Flag" (Jake Burns, Gordon Ogilvie) – 3:48
"At the Edge" (Burns) – 2:57
"Gotta Getaway" (Burns, Ogilvie) – 3:16
"Wait and See" (Burns, Ogilvie) – 4:32
"Just Fade Away" (Burns, Ogilvie) – 3:01
"The Only One" (Henry Cluney, Ogilvie) – 4:10
"Roots, Radicals, Rockers and Reggae" (Stiff Little Fingers) – 3:51
"Piccadilly Circus" (Burns, Ogilvie) – 4:38
"Sad Eyed People" (Burns, Ogilvie) – 3:56
"Listen" (Burns, Ogilvie) – 4:00
"That's When Your Blood Bumps" (Ogilvie) – 3:51
"Two Guitars Clash" (Cluney, Ogilvie) – 4:16
"Love of the Common People" (John Hurley, Ronnie Wilkins) – 2:31
"Stands to Reason" (Ogilvie, Brian "Dolphin" Taylor) – 3:02
"Falling Down" (Burns, Ogilvie) – 3:15
"Touch and Go" (Cluney, Ogilvie) – 3:02

Personnel
Stiff Little Fingers
Jake Burns – vocals, guitar
Ali McMordie – bass guitar
Henry Cluney – rhythm guitar, vocals, background vocals
Jim Reilly – drums (tracks 1–8)
Dolphin Taylor – drums (tracks 9–16)
Technical
John Sparrow – producer
Alan Parker – liner notes

External links
Tracklisting/audio clips of the Radio One Sessions
[ Album at Allmusic.com]

BBC Radio recordings
2003 live albums
2003 compilation albums
Stiff Little Fingers compilation albums
Stiff Little Fingers live albums